Justin Jeremiah "Jerry" McCarthy (January 25, 1899 – April 8, 1976) was an American ice hockey player who competed in the 1924 Winter Olympics.

He was a graduate of the Massachusetts Agricultural College in 1921, (later, the University of Massachusetts), where he was a member of Phi Sigma Kappa fraternity.

Selected for the USA squad, McCarthy was the captain of the American ice hockey team, which won the silver medal. He died in Centerville, Massachusetts.

References

External links
profile

1899 births
1976 deaths
American men's ice hockey players
Ice hockey players from Massachusetts
Ice hockey players at the 1924 Winter Olympics
Medalists at the 1924 Winter Olympics
Olympic silver medalists for the United States in ice hockey